Junxattus is a monotypic genus of southeast Asian jumping spiders native to Sumatra. It contains the single species, Junxattus daiqini, first described by Jerzy Prószyński and Christa Deeleman-Reinhold in 2012. The genus was placed in the subfamily Euophryinae, the equivalent of the tribe Euophryini.

In 2015, Junxia Zhang and Wayne Maddison rejected the genus, placing the species in Laufeia. The genus was re-validated by Prószyński in 2019, and it is accepted by the World Spider Catalog .

See also
 Laufeia
 List of Salticidae genera

References

Further reading

Monotypic Salticidae genera
Endemic fauna of Sumatra